Bule is an Indonesian word for foreigners and/or non-Indonesian national, specifically people of European descent ('white', 'Caucasian').

Etymology
The word was in use in the 19th century and probably earlier, meaning 'white', when referring to buffalo. An 1840 book noted that people preferred 'bulei' (white) buffalo to 'hitam' (which is the current Indonesian word for black).

An 1869 Malay-Dutch dictionary notes the words 'balar', 'sabun' and 'andan' as referring to 'white people' (wit mensch) and 'albinos'. An 1894 Malay-English dictionary noted the words 'andan' and 'bulei' as referring to albinos, and 'sabun' (a word in current usage as soap) as an adjective for all-white dogs, and for albinos. The word 'balar' is given as an adjective meaning white in the context of buffalos, and also albinos.

A 1948 Javanese Indonesian dictionary notes  boelé, balar and boelai as a suffix to the Javanese 'wong' or 'person', in Indonesian 'orang balar' or 'orang saboen'.

Subsequent dictionaries may define 'bule' simply as albino. However, in current usage the English loanword, albino is more commonly used.

Usage
In spoken form, the word may be used by street vendors to attract tourists or foreigners' attention. Because some Westerners find the word insulting, more cautious street vendors use the term Mister, which foreigners find more polite.  As an alternative to 'bule', the adjective 'barat' (literally means west, as in Western) may be an alternative. Compare with güero.

As a word for foreigner, the term can have pejorative intent, and many Westerners residing in Indonesia find it stereotypical and offensive.

See also 
 Laowai, in China
 Gaijin, in Japan
 Pendatang and Mat Salleh, in Malaysia
 Ang mo, in Malaysia, Singapore and Taiwan
 Gweilo, in Southern China, Hong Kong and Macau
 Farang, in Thailand

References

External links 
 Bule
 "Bule - The Good, The Bad, and The Ugly"
 "The Latest Trend: Date a Bule?"

Pejorative terms for in-group non-members
Indonesian words and phrases
Slang